Rudi Pablo Lausarot Bobenrieth (born 3 April 1975 in Young) is a Uruguayan 10 m Air Rifle sport shooter. 

He competed at the 2012 Summer Olympics in the Men's 10 metre air rifle and at the 2011 Pan American Games in the Men's 10 metre air rifle.

References

External links
Profile at SportsReference.com
Profile at London2012.com
ISSF Portrait

1975 births
Living people
People from Río Negro Department
Uruguayan male sport shooters
ISSF rifle shooters
Olympic shooters of Uruguay
Shooters at the 2012 Summer Olympics
Shooters at the 2011 Pan American Games
Pan American Games competitors for Uruguay
21st-century Uruguayan people